Hadi Rezaeigarkani (born December 10, 1960) is an Iranian sitting volleyball coach, and former player with world and Paralympic medals, currently as the head coach of Iran's men's sitting volleyball team. He was born in Mashhad, Iran.

Paralympics

Coach 
 Sydney 2000 - Gold Medal
 Athens 2004 - Silver Medal
 Beijing 2008 - Gold Medal
 London 2012 - Silver Medal 
 Rio 2016 - Gold Medal
 Tokyo 2020 - Gold Medal

Athlete and team Captain 
 Atlanta 1996 - Gold Medal
 Barcelona 1992 - Gold Medal
 Seoul 1988 - Gold Medal

World Championships

Coach 
 Bosnia and Herzegovina 2022 - Gold Medal 
 Netherlands 2018 - Gold Medal
 Poland 2014 - Bronze Medal
 Oklahoma 2010 - Gold Medal
 Netherlands 2006 - Silver Medal 
 Egypt 2002 - Bronze Medal
 Tehran 1998 - Gold Medal

Athlete and the team captain 
 Germany 1994 - Gold Medal
 Netherlands 1990 - Gold Medal 
 Hungry 1986 - Gold Medal, not captain in Hungary. 
 Norway 1985 - Gold Medal, not captain in Norway.

World Clubs Championship

Coach 
 Egypt 2012 - Gold Medal (Zobahan Isfahan- Iran)
 Egypt 2011 - Gold Medal (Zobahan Isfahan- Iran) 
 Egypt 2009 - Gold Medal (Zobahan Isfahan- Iran) 
 Egypt 2007 - Gold Medal (Zobahan Isfahan- Iran) 
 Germany 2003 - Gold Medal (Pegah- Iran)

Asian Clubs Championship

Coach 
 China 2013 - Gold Medal (samen alhojaj- Iran)
 China 2011 - Gold Medal (Zobahan Isfahan- Iran) 
 China 2009 - Gold Medal (Asia Gostaresh Foolad Gostar- Iran)

Administrator 
 AOPV Secratory general 2014-2018
 IRISFD member's at large 2014-2018
 IRINPC honorary board member 2014
 IRISFD technical deputy 2012-2014
 World para Volley executive member 2010-2012
 AOCVD para volleyball vice president 2008-2014 
 Khorasan sports board for the athletes with disabilities-president 2004-2019
 Khorasan sports board for the athletes with disabilities-vice-president 1996-2004

Education 
 Educator in sitting volleyball 2008
 Olympics solidarity 2006
 International coaching sitting volleyball 2003

See also 
 Iran at the Paralympics
 Iran at the 1988 Summer Paralympics
 Iran at the 1992 Summer Paralympics
 Iran at the 1996 Summer Paralympics
 Iran at the 2004 Summer Paralympics
 Iran at the 2008 Summer Paralympics
 Sitting volleyball at the 2008 Summer Paralympics

References 

Living people
1960 births
Paralympic competitors for Iran
Sportspeople from Mashhad
Iranian sitting volleyball players
Men's sitting volleyball players
Paralympic gold medalists for Iran
Volleyball players at the 1992 Summer Paralympics
Volleyball players at the 1988 Summer Paralympics
Volleyball players at the 1996 Summer Paralympics
Medalists at the 1988 Summer Paralympics
Medalists at the 1992 Summer Paralympics
Medalists at the 1996 Summer Paralympics
Iranian volleyball coaches
Paralympic medalists in volleyball
Paralympic volleyball players of Iran
20th-century Iranian people
21st-century Iranian people